L Catterton is a U.S.-headquartered private equity firm. Since 1989, the firm has made more than 250 investments in brands across all segments of the consumer industry.

L Catterton is led by its co-Chief Executive Officers, J. Michael Chu and Scott Dahnke.

History

Founding & early history
Catterton was founded in 1989 as Catterton-Simon Partners by Frank Vest and J. Michael Chu, along with former U.S. Secretary of the Treasury William E. Simon.

Between 1992 and 2002, the company invested in well-known consumer brands including P. F. Chang's, Odwalla, and Baja Fresh.     

In 2001, the firm changed its name to Catterton Partners.

2002-2016 
Between 2002 and 2016, Catterton completed investments in numerous consumer growth businesses including Peloton, Build-A-Bear Workshop, Ferrara Candy Company, Outback Steakhouse, Restoration Hardware, Wellness Pet Company, and Kettle Foods.   

In 2003, Scott Dahnke joined the firm as a co-Managing Partner.

In 2008, the firm launched its first growth fund targeting investments in early to late-stage growth companies. These investments included Vroom, Sweaty Betty, Il Makiage, Sweet Leaf Tea Company and Tula.

In 2013, the firm launched its Latin America fund targeting investments in Latin American middle market growth companies. Notable investments in the Latin America strategy include Cholula Hot Sauce and NotCo.

2016-present
In January 2016, Catterton, LVMH, and Financière Agache (previously Groupe Arnault), the family holding company of Bernard Arnault, partnered to create L Catterton.  The partnership combined Catterton's existing North American and Latin American private equity operations with LVMH and Groupe Arnault's pre-existing European and Asian private equity and real estate operations. The merged firm is now called L Catterton and invests globally from six fund platforms: L Catterton Flagship Buyout, L Catterton North American Growth, L Catterton Latin America, L Catterton Europe, L Catterton Asia, and L Catterton Real Estate.  In May 2021, Private Equity International listed L Catterton as the 32nd largest private equity firm in the world based on capital raised over the prior five years.

In 2020, L Catterton raised over $5b for its ninth buyout fund and over $950m for its fourth growth fund.

Investments
The firm has backed several notable investments, including Birkenstock, Indian tech giant Jio Platform, Ainsworth Pet Nutrition, Peloton, Nature’s Variety,  Pinarello, Freetrade, the Miami Design District, and Ginza Six.

References

External links

Private equity firms of the United States
Financial services companies established in 1989
Companies based in Greenwich, Connecticut
1989 establishments in Connecticut